Life Triumphs may refer to:

 Nahapet or Life Triumphs, a 1977 Armenian drama film
 Life Triumphs (1951 film), a 1951 Romanian drama film